"Down" is a song by British rock band the Kooks. It was released on 18 April 2014 through Virgin EMI Records as the lead single from the band's fourth studio album Listen, which was scheduled to be released on 1 September 2014. The song debuted on UK Singles Chart at number 40. It has also reportedly divided fans.

Background and release
"Down" is the first song released by the Kooks since their 2012 single "Rosie". The song was written by the band's frontman Luke Pritchard and hip-hop pioneer Inflo for the band's upcoming studio album Listen. "Down" was recorded in Los Angeles and London. According to reports, the song is "a mission statement from a band that have rediscovered what they loved about making music in the first place." The R&B-inspired track features "looped hooks and crazy percussion" and has a "contagious swagger."

The song premiered on 11 March 2014 on BBC Radio 1 as Zane Lowe's 'Hottest Record'. It was released digitally on 18 April 2014, and as a 7" vinyl on 21 April 2014.

Music video
A music video for the song was released onto YouTube on 20 March 2014. It was directed by Davis Silis.

Track listing

Personnel

The Kooks
Luke Pritchard – vocals, guitar, co-production
Hugh Harris – guitar 
Peter Denton – bass
Alexis Nunez – drums

Additional personnel
Inflo – production

Charts

Release history

References

2014 singles
2014 songs
The Kooks songs
Virgin EMI Records singles